Events from the year 1968 in North Korea.

Incumbents
Premier: Kim Il-sung 
Supreme Leader: Kim Il-sung

Events

Deaths

 5 March - Hong Myong-hui.

See also
Years in Japan
Years in South Korea

References

 
North Korea
1960s in North Korea
Years of the 20th century in North Korea
North Korea